Gonji is a district of Amhara Region in Ethiopia.

See also 

 Districts of Ethiopia

References 

Districts of Amhara Region